Georgia State Route 107 (SR 107) is a  state highway that exists in the southern part of the U.S. state of Georgia. It travels from Interstate 75 (I-75) in Ashburn to U.S. Route 221 (US 221) in rural Jeff Davis County.

Route description 
SR 107 begins at an interchange with Interstate 75 (I-75) in Ashburn. It then travels to the east toward Fitzgerald, concurrent with SR 112 for approximately  before departing. The highway then goes through rural Turner and Irwin counties before an intersection with SR 125 just west of Fitzgerald. Once in Fitzgerald, SR 107 has an intersection with U.S. Route 129 (US 129) and US 319. It shares a concurrency with US 319 as the highway leaves Fitzgerald and goes through rural Ben Hill County. The highway has intersections with SR 206 and SR 182 before entering Coffee County. Soon after entering Coffee County, the highway intersects US 441 and leaves its concurrency with US 319. SR 107 shares a brief concurrency with US 441 before turning east into rural Coffee and Jeff Davis counties. SR 107 has an intersection with SR 268 in Snipesville before reaching its eastern terminus with US 221 north of Denton.

Major intersections

See also

References

External links

 

107
Transportation in Turner County, Georgia
Transportation in Irwin County, Georgia
Transportation in Ben Hill County, Georgia
Transportation in Coffee County, Georgia
Transportation in Jeff Davis County, Georgia